is Kurumi Enomoto's second studio album, released on . It debuted at #43 on the Japanese Oricon album charts, and charted in the top 300 for four weeks.

The album was preceded by five singles, though "Bōken Suisei", the preceding single and ending theme song for the anime Tales of the Abyss, was the only that charted.

The song  was released as a radio single at the time of the album's release, reaching #83 on the Billboard'' Japan Singles Top 100 chart. No music video was produced, however.

The album features 11 previously released songs from singles, along with four new tracks. All of the songs (not counting the bonus hidden tracks) from the "Yūhi ga Oka/Minna Genki", "Mirai Kinenbi" and "Bōken Suisei" singles feature on the album, though not "She" from the "Real/She" single. "Cure", a B-side on the "Real/She" single is featured on the album with a complete new arrangement.

The album's title is a pun:  sounds like , one of the lyrics from "Bōken Suisei".

Track listing

Japan sales rankings

References
 	

Kurumi Enomoto albums
2009 albums